The 2011 Tashkent Open was a tennis tournament played on outdoor hard courts. It was the 13th edition of the Tashkent Open, and was part of the WTA International tournaments of the 2011 WTA Tour. It took place at the Tashkent Tennis Center in Tashkent, Uzbekistan, from September 12 through September 17, 2011.

Entrants

 1 Rankings are as of August 29, 2011.

Other entrants
The following players received wildcards into the singles main draw:
  Nigina Abduraimova
  Kamilla Farhad
  Sabina Sharipova

The following players received entry from the qualifying draw:

  Jana Čepelová
  Eirini Georgatou
  Aleksandra Krunić
  Victoria Larrière

Champions

Singles

 Ksenia Pervak def.  Eva Birnerová, 6–3, 6–1.
It was Pervak's first career title.

Doubles

 Eleni Daniilidou /  Vitalia Diatchenko def.  Lyudmyla Kichenok /  Nadiia Kichenok, 6–4, 6–3.

External links
Official Website

 
Tashkent Open
Tashkent Open
Tennis tournaments in Uzbekistan
2011 in Uzbekistani sport